The 1998–99 North Carolina Tar Heels men's basketball team represented the University of North Carolina at Chapel Hill during the 1998–99 NCAA Division I men's basketball season. The team's head coach was Bill Guthridge, who was in his second season as UNC's head men's basketball coach. The Tar Heels played their home games at the Dean Smith Center in Chapel Hill, North Carolina as members of the Atlantic Coast Conference.

After a third-place finish during the conference regular season, the Tar Heels advanced to the ACC tournament title game where they fell to Duke. North Carolina received an at-large bid to the NCAA tournament as No. 3 seed in the West region, but were upset by Weber State in the opening round to finish 24–10 (10–6 ACC).

Roster

Schedule and results

|-
!colspan=6 style=| Non-conference regular season

|-
!colspan=6 style=| ACC Regular Season

|-
!colspan=6 style=| ACC Tournament

|-
!colspan=6 style=| NCAA tournament

Rankings 

^Coaches did not release a Week 1 poll.

References 

North Carolina Tar Heels men's basketball seasons
North Carolina
Tar
Tar
North Carolina